The 2016 Rugby Europe Under-18 Sevens Trophy was hosted by Hungary in Esztergom from 17–18 September.

Teams

Pool stages

Pool A

Pool B

Pool C

Finals 
Cup Quarterfinals

Plate Semifinals

Bowl Semifinals

Final standings

References 

2021
2016 rugby sevens competitions
2016 in European sport
Rugby Europe Under-18